Éric Laurent may refer to:

 Eric Laurent (actor) (1894–1958), a Swedish actor
 Éric Laurent (psychoanalyst), French psychoanalyst
 Éric Laurent (journalist) (born 1947), French journalist